Florida is a ballet in three acts and five scenes, with libretto and choreography by Marius Petipa and music by Cesare Pugni. The work was first presented by the Imperial Ballet at the Imperial Bolshoi Kamenny Theatre on January 10/22 (Julian/Gregorian calendar dates), 1866, in St. Petersburg, Russia, with Mariia Surovshchikova-Petipa as Florida.

John Philip Sousa included a suite from Pugni's score for Florida in his band's repertory, as well as the Grand Ballet Suite from Pugni's score for Petipa's The Pharaoh's Daughter.

See also 
 List of ballets by title

References

Ballets by Marius Petipa
Ballets by Cesare Pugni
1866 ballet premieres
Ballets premiered at the Bolshoi Theatre, Saint Petersburg